Sólo quiero caminar (I Only Want to Walk) is the fourteenth studio album by the Spanish composer and guitarist Paco de Lucía. All tunes were written by Paco de Lucía.

Track listing
 "Sólo quiero caminar" (Tangos) (Paco de Lucía, Pepe de Lucía) – 6:16
 "La Tumbona" (Bulerías) – 4:19
 "Convite" (Rumba) – 3:55
 "Montiño" (Fandangos de Huelva) – 4:02
 "Chanela" (Rumba) – 3:56
 "Monasterio de sal" (Colombianas) – 4:52
 "Piñonate" (Bulerías) – 4:44
 "Palenque" – 4:51

Musicians
 Paco de Lucía - Flamenco guitar
 Ramón de Algeciras - second guitar
 Pepe de Lucía - vocals
 Rubem Dantas - percussion
 Carles Benavent - bass
 Jorge Pardo - flute, saxophone

References
 Gamboa, Manuel José and Nuñez, Faustino. (2003). Paco de Lucía. Madrid:Universal Music Spain.

1981 albums
Paco de Lucía albums